Paul Solman (born September 9, 1944) is a journalist who has specialized in economics, business, and politics since the early 1970s.  He has been the  business and economics correspondent for the PBS NewsHour since 1985, with occasional forays into art reporting.

He began his career in business journalism as a Nieman Fellow, studying at the Harvard Business School. A graduate of Brandeis University (1966), he was the founding editor of the alternative Boston weekly The Real Paper in 1972. He was the East Coast Editor of Mother Jones magazine in the late 1970s. He has won eight Emmys, four Peabodys, and a Loeb award and, improbably, a James Beard award (though not for any cuisine art). Solman also taught at the Harvard Business School from 1985 to 1987. He joined the PBS NewsHour, then known as The MacNeil/Lehrer NewsHour, in 1985.

From 2007 to 2016, he was a faculty member at Yale University's International Security Studies program, teaching in its "Grand Strategy" course. He also lectured for years at the Yale Young Global Scholars  program, the Warrior-Scholar program  at Yale, has taught at West Point, among many universities, and was the Richman Distinguished Visiting Professor at Brandeis in 2011. He has also taught economics at Gateway Community College in New Haven, Connecticut, where he founded the Yale@Gateway speaker series. In 2016, he was visiting fellow at Mansfield College, Oxford University.

Solman co-produced, with Bob Burns, and presented a series of companion videos to McGraw-Hill economics textbooks.
In 1983, he co-authored, with longtime PBS executive and writer Thomas Friedman, a better-than-average-seller, Life and Death on the Corporate Battlefield (1983), which appeared in Japanese, German and a pirated Taiwanese edition.

In 1994, with sociologist Morrie Schwartz, he helped create—and wrote the introduction to—the book Morrie: In His Own Words, which preceded Tuesdays with Morrie but failed to outsell it by several orders of magnitude.
His latest book, a collaboration with economist Laurence Kotlikoff and author Philip Moeller, is a bonafide bestseller, Get What's Yours: The Secrets to Maxing Out Your Social Security (Simon and Schuster, 2015). The book was reissued in May 2016 due to changes in Social Security regulations.

In 2018, he created, with his former Yale student David McCullough and longtime Harvard professor Robert Glauber, former Republican Deputy Secretary of the Treasury, "The American Exchange Project"  The American Exchange Project is a nonpolitical nonprofit social innovation initiative which recruits high school seniors from everywhere in the country and gets them to both host seniors from elsewhere in their own community for a week in the summer after graduation and sends them to a community very different from their own for a week, all for free. Solman is president of the board and an active recruiter of communities in every nook and cranny of America.

Personal life
Solman is married to Jan Freeman, a former language columnist for the Boston Globe. His father, Joseph Solman, was a painter and co-founder of The Ten art movement.

He has two grown daughters and seven grandchildren.

Awards (partial)
 Emmys (1978, 1982, 1984 (2), 1998, 2005, 2007, 2009)
 Peabody Awards (1987, 2004, 2019, 2020)
 2006 Gerald Loeb Award for Television Enterprise business journalism for "China Rising"
 James Beard Award (2018)

References

{{|url=http://www.americanexchangeproject.org|title=American Exchange Project|}}

21st-century American economists
American television personalities
1944 births
Living people
American people of Belarusian-Jewish descent
Harvard Business School alumni
Nieman Fellows
Brandeis University alumni
PBS people
Gerald Loeb Award winners for Television